Water in My Head is a Buck-O-Nine EP released in 1996 on Taang! Records, and features a recording of the classic Greek folk song Miserlou, recorded with members of Agent Orange

Track listing
"Water in My Head"
"Milk?"
"Dr. Kitch"
"Positively Shelby"
"Miserlou"

Personnel
Jon Pebsworth - Vocals
Jonas Kleiner - Guitar
Dan Albert - Trombone
Anthony Curry - Trumpet
Craig Yarnold - Alto Sax
Scott Kennerly - Bass
Steve Bauer - Drums
Mike Palm - guitar on Miserlou

Recorded and mixed by Geoff Gibbs.

1996 EPs
Buck-O-Nine albums
Taang! Records albums